Wilhelm Schüchter (15 December 1911 – 27 May 1974) was a German conductor. He was Generalmusikdirektor in Dortmund and left a legacy of opera recordings.

Career 
Born in Bonn, Schüchter studied piano at the Hochschule für Musik Köln, composition with Philipp Jarnach, and orchestral conducting with Hermann Abendroth. His debut was at the Landestheater Coburg Mascagni's Cavalleria rusticana and Leoncavallo's Pagliacci.

In 1940, he was at the Mainfranken Theater Würzburg, a year later he worked at the Stadttheater Aachen under Herbert von Karajan. In 1943, he was first Kapellmeister of the Theater am Nollendorfplatz in Berlin. From 1945 to 1957, he was second conductor under Hans Schmidt-Isserstedt of the Sinfonieorchester von Radio Hamburg, in 1956 named NDR Sinfonieorchester. From 1953 to 1955, he was also principal conductor of the Nordwestdeutsche Philharmonie in Herford. Since 1959 he conducted the NHK Symphony Orchestra. His last position was in 1962 Generalmusikdirektor of the Dortmunder Philharmoniker, since 1966 also Intendant of the Dortmund Opera. He improved the quality of the orchestra and opened the new Opernhaus Dortmund with a performance of Der Rosenkavalier of Strauss, with Elisabeth Grümmer as Marschallin, Teresa Żylis-Gara as Octavian and Kurt Böhme as Ochs. In 1967, he conducted the premiere of the opera Eli by Walter Steffens after the drama of Nelly Sachs, a commission of the city of Dortmund.

Discography 
In 1954, he conducted recordings of Handel's organ concertos with Geraint Jones and the Philharmonia Orchestra.

Schüchter recorded operas and excerpts of operas (Querschnitte) for EMI, typically sung in German by notable soloists such as Elisabeth Grümmer and Erika Köth. In 1951, he recorded Wagner's Der fliegende Holländer with Hans Hotter in the title role, Kurt Böhme as Daland, Helene Werth as Senta, Bernd Aldenhoff as Erik, Res Fischer as Mary and Helmut Krebs as Steuermann, with North German Radio Symphony Orchestra and Choir. In 1953, he recorded, again with Chor und Sinfonieorchester des Norddeutschen Rundfunks, Wagner's Lohengrin with Rudolf Schock in the title role, Gottlob Frick as Heinrich, Maud Cunitz as Elsa, Josef Metternich as Telramund, Margarete Klose as Ortrud. In 1953, he conducted Puccini's Tosca, sung in German by Carla Martinis in the title role, Schock as Cavaradossi, and Josef Metternich as Scarpia. In 1955, he recorded Smetana's opera The Bartered Bride with the Nordwestdeutsche Philharmonie, the chorus of the Landestheater Hannover, Erna Berger, Schock, Frick, Hanns-Heinz Nissen, Christa Ludwig, Theodor Schlott and Marga Höffgen. In 1955, he also recorded Der Rosenkavalier with the Berlin Philharmonic, Leonie Rysanek as Marschallin, Elisabeth Grümmer as Octavian, Erika Köth as Sophie, Gustav Neidlinger as Ochs, Sieglinde Wagner as Annina and Josef Traxel as the singer.

In the 1960s, he recorded excerpts of operas, Flotow's Martha, Lortzing's Undine (with Lisa Otto) and Der Wildschütz, and Weber's Oberon with Jess Thomas as Hüon and Ingrid Bjoner as Rezia. With the Deutsche Oper Berlin he recorded excerpts of Gounod's Margarete (with Hilde Güden), Mascagni's Cavalleria rusticana with Rysanek, Schock and Metternich, and Nicolai's Die lustigen Weiber von Windsor with Köth, Frick and Dietrich Fischer-Dieskau.

He also conducted radio productions, namely for the NDR and the WDR. He died in Dortmund.

Further reading 
 Rudolf Schroeder: Das Philharmonische Orchester der Stadt Dortmund. Zwölf Jahre Wilhelm Schüchter 1962–1974. Ein Beitrag zur Geschichte des städtischen Musiklebens. Rabe, Dortmund 1982.
 Fred K. Prieberg: Handbuch Deutsche Musiker 1933–1945. Kiel 2004, p. 6342 (CD-ROM-Lexikon).

References

External links 
 
 Wilhelm Schüchter operatic discography

German male conductors (music)
1911 births
1974 deaths
Hochschule für Musik und Tanz Köln alumni
20th-century German conductors (music)
20th-century German male musicians